Susan Lynn Kiger (born November 16, 1953 in Pasadena, California) is an American model and actress. Kiger was the Playboy Playmate of the Month for January 1977. Her centerfold was photographed by Pompeo Posar and Ken Marcus. In addition, she appeared on the cover of Playboy three times: March 1977, November 1977, and April 1978.

Making her debut in the adult movie Deadly Love (or Hot Nasties, 1976), she went on to appear in several films, including the sex comedy H.O.T.S. (1979) alongside fellow Playmate Pamela Bryant, Angels Revenge (1979), Seven (1979), The Happy Hooker Goes Hollywood (1980), Galaxina (1980) with fellow Playmate Dorothy Stratten, The Return (1980), and the horror film Death Screams (1982).

References

External links
 
 

1970s Playboy Playmates
American film actresses
American television actresses
1953 births
Living people
21st-century American women